Marth Mariyam Metropolitan Cathedral, also known as Valiyapally, is the cathedral of the Syro-Malabar Catholic Archeparchy of Changanassery (Archieparchia Changanacherrensis) and also a Marian pilgrimage centre in Kerala, India.

History
The local Christian community in and around Changanachery inherits its faith directly from St. Thomas the Apostle, who formed a Christian community of faithful, centered on Niranam in the 1st century. The first church in Changanachery was established in 1177. The plot of land for the church was donated by the local Hindu king of Thekkumkoor. The current church is the fourth one in its place. The church was reconstructed and consecrated in 1887. The cathedral is ornamented with ancient Hindu temple carvings.

References

Eastern Catholic cathedrals in Kerala
Churches in Kottayam district
Syro-Malabar Catholic Archeparchy of Changanassery
Syro-Malabar Catholic cathedrals
Churches completed in 1887
Changanassery